"Gold Roses" is a song by American rapper Rick Ross featuring Canadian rapper Drake. It was released by Epic Records as the third single from Ross's album Port of Miami 2 on July 26, 2019. It follows Drake's "Money in the Grave" featuring Ross, which was released a month earlier in June 2019. The track contains samples from "Israël Suite", written by Sylvian Krief and Boris Bergman, and performed by Rupture. The song was nominated for a Grammy Award for Best Rap Song at the 62nd Annual Grammy Awards.

Charts

Certifications

References

2019 singles
2019 songs
Rick Ross songs
Drake (musician) songs
Songs written by Rick Ross
Songs written by Drake (musician)
Songs written by Vinylz
Songs written by Leon Thomas III
Songs written by Oz (record producer)
Music videos directed by Colin Tilley
Songs written by Khristopher Riddick-Tynes